Scandalo in famiglia (Scandal in the family) is a 1976 Italian commedia sexy all'italiana directed by Marcello Andrei.

Plot 
Elena loves her uncle, but she is forced to marry a nobleman. The only solution is the adultery. So she still keeps her erotic feelings towards her uncle.

Cast 
Gloria Guida: Elena
Carlo Giuffré: the uncle
Gianluigi Ghirizzi: Saverio
Lucretia Love: Nunziata
Ines Pellegrini
Loredana Martinez
Gianni Nazzaro
Luciana Turina
Mario Maranzana
Giuseppe Anatrelli

See also 
 
 List of Italian films of 1976

References

External links

1976 films
1970s sex comedy films
Commedia sexy all'italiana
Adultery in films
1970s Italian-language films
Films directed by Marcello Andrei
1976 comedy films
1970s Italian films